In Thelema, the Abyss is the great gulf or void between the phenomenal world of manifestation and its noumenal source.

Theory and practice
The founder of Thelema, author Aleister Crowley, says of the Abyss in his Little Essays Toward Truth:

On a practical level, Crowley's published instructions on the Abyss tell the reader to consider some philosophical problem without using magic or intuition, until the mind focuses on this problem of its own accord: "Then will all phenomena which present themselves to him appear meaningless and disconnected, and his own Ego will break up into a series of impressions having no relation one with the other, or with any other thing." This prepares the student for the mystical experience that Crowley elsewhere calls Shivadarshana. Crowley modeled these instructions on his own experiences in the year 1905. The Vision and the Voice describes two additional methods of entering the Abyss. The first of these "concerns things of which it (was) unlawful to speak openly under penalty of the most dreadful punishment," namely receptive homosexual intercourse under the desert sun that went against Crowley's social habits of conduct or his conscious self-image. The second involves ceremonial magic and focuses more on the theory behind the Abyss.

In the Qabalistic system of Crowley, the Abyss contains the 11th (hidden) sephira, Da'ath, which separates the lower sephiroth from the supernals. This account derives from the Hermetic Order of the Golden Dawn's view of Genesis, in which Da'ath represents the fall of man from a unified consciousness into a duality between ego and divine nature, which separates us from the divine "Supernals". The Abyss is guarded by the demon Choronzon, who manifests during the third, ceremonial method of crossing this gulf. He represents those parts of one's consciousness and unconsciousness — "a momentary unity capable of sensation and of expression", in Crowley's terms — that are unwilling or unable to enter the Divine. 

According to Grant Morrison in the Richard Metzger Book of Lies, at least, Choronzon

is Existential Self at the last gasp...Beyond Choronzon we are no longer our Self. The "personality" on the brink of the Abyss will do anything, say anything and find any excuse to avoid taking this disintegrating step into "non-being."

"Crossing the Abyss" is regarded as a perilous operation, and the most important work of the magician's career. Success confers graduation into the degree of Magister Templi, or "Master of the Temple."

The Book of Lies
Crowley specifically wrote his 1913 volume, The Book of Lies, for what he called the "Babes of the Abyss" (writing at the start of the book, "It is an official publication for Babes of the Abyss").

See also
 Abyss (religion)
 Abzu
 Magical formula
 Night of Pan

Notes

References

Citations

Works cited

 
 
 
 
 
 
 
 

Thelema